Louisa Twining (16 November 1820 – 25 September 1912) was an English philanthropic worker who devoted herself to issues and tasks related to the English Poor Law. Her family owned the famous Twinings tea business on the Strand, which is a renowned business nowadays. In the early part of her adult life, Louisa was an artist and art historian. In her 30s she started work on projects related to the Poor Law which she followed for the rest of her life. She helped to establish a home for workhouse girls and a number of societies and associations related to workhouses and infirmaries.  She also served as a Poor Law guardian and was president of the Women's Local Government Society.

Biography
Louisa Twining was born at 20 Norfolk Street (now gone) in central London, not far from her family's famous Twinings tea business on the Strand. She was the ninth and youngest child of Richard Twining (1772–1857), and his wife Elizabeth Mary, née Smythies (1779–1866).

Twining's maternal ancestry is well documented in The Longcrofts: 500 Years of a British Family by James Phillips-Evans (Amazon UK, 2012). In the early part of her adult life, Louisa was an artist and art historian and she wrote and published Symbols and Emblems of Mediaeval Christian Art (1852) and Types and Figures of the Bible (1854). Louisa was the youngest sister of the botanical artist Elizabeth Twining.

Louisa  was inspired in her youth by the conditions in which her nurse lived in her advanced age: the old woman lived in one of the poorest districts in London. With exposure to such poverty, Twining felt inclined to improve social conditions. In 1853, she became interested in movements for social reform, and began the work in connection with the Poor Law to which she devoted the rest of her life. In March 1861, she helped to establish a home for workhouse girls sent out to service, in 1864 the Workhouse Visiting Society, in 1866 the Association for the Improvement of the Infirmaries of London Workhouses and in 1879 the Workhouse Infirmary Nursing Association.  She was said to be ‘the most practical woman I have ever known amongst the many who have taken an interest in the subject’ by Uvedale Corbett.

She was a Poor Law guardian for Kensington during 1884–90, and for Tonbridge Union during 1893–6. She promoted the opening of Lincoln's Inn Fields to the public, helped to start the Metropolitan and National Association for nursing the poor in their homes, did much to secure the appointment of police matrons, and was president of the Women's Local Government Society.

Louisa Twining died in her home at 91, Lansdowne Road, Notting Hill, London on 25 September 1912. She is buried at Kensal Green Cemetery.

Selected publications
Symbols in Early Christian Art. 1852.
Types and Figures of the Bible. 1854.
 Recollections of Life and Work: Being the Autobiography of Louisa Twining. Edward Arnold, London, 1893. 
Workhouses and pauperism and women's work in the administration of the poor law. Methuen, London, 1898.

In addition, she wrote many papers on Poor Law subjects. 
 Books published by Louisa Twining Internet Archive - read online

Archives
Papers of Louisa Twining are held at The Women's Library at London Metropolitan University.

References

External links
 
 

1820 births
1912 deaths
Burials at Kensal Green Cemetery
Philanthropists from London
English activists
English women activists
Louisa
19th-century British philanthropists
19th-century English women
19th-century English people
19th-century women philanthropists